Virtuous Liars is a 1924 American silent drama film directed by Whitman Bennett and starring David Powell, Edith Allen, Maurice Costello, and Dagmar Godowsky. A man abandons his wife and child and goes to live in Havana with another woman. His wife makes a success of herself, but he then returns and attempts to blackmail her.

Plot
As described in a film magazine review, Jack Banton deserts his wife Edith and their three-year-old child, goes to Havana, and becomes involved with Juanita, a young Cuban woman. Edith pursues an art career, aided by Josiah Wright, a wealthy man, whose nephew, Dr. Norman Wright, is engaged to Julia Livingston. Josiah dies, leaving Edith a fortune. She loves Dr. Wright. Jack returns, blackmails his wife and abducts the child. Juanita follows Jack. Edith buys her freedom from Jack, who is slain by a Cuban who is infatuated with Juanita. Julia breaks her engagement with Dr. Wright, who weds Edith.

Cast

References

Bibliography
 Munden, Kenneth White. The American Film Institute Catalog of Motion Pictures Produced in the United States, Part 1. University of California Press, 1997.

External links

1924 films
1924 drama films
Silent American drama films
Films directed by Whitman Bennett
American silent feature films
1920s English-language films
American black-and-white films
Vitagraph Studios films
Films set in Havana
1920s American films